The Benz Bz.III was a six-cylinder, water-cooled, inline engine developed in Germany for use in aircraft in 1914. Developing 112 kW (150 hp) at 1,400 rpm from 14.3 L (875 cu in), it powered many German military aircraft during World War I. It was replaced in production by the unrelated Benz Bz.IIIa. and eventually the V-8 Benz Bz.IIIb. The Benz Bz.III was built under licence in Sweden by AB Thulinverken, known as the Thulin E.

Applications

 AEG C.I
 AEG C.II
 AEG C.III
 AEG C.IV
 AEG G.II
 Albatros C.I
 Albatros C.II
 Albatros C.III
 Albatros D.I
 Albatros W.3
 Albatros G.II
 Friedrichshafen FF.33
 Friedrichshafen FF.41
 Friedrichshafen G.I
 Gotha G.I
 Hansa-Brandenburg KDW
 Hansa-Brandenburg W.12
 Hansa-Brandenburg W.29
 LFG Roland D.VII
 Riesenflugzeug – Germany's giant aircraft of WWI

Specifications

See also

References

Bibliography

 Kyrill von Gersdorff, Kurt Grasmann. Flugmotoren und Strahltriebwerke, Bernard & Graefe Verlag, 1981, 
 Smith, Herschel. Aircraft Piston Engines. New York: McGraw-Hill, 1981. .

External links 

1910s aircraft piston engines